Plodopitomnik is the name of at least two rural localities Russia:
Plodopitomnik, Republic of Adygea, a selo in Dmitriyevskoye Rural Settlement of Koshekhablsky District
Plodopitomnik, Amur Oblast, a settlement in urban okrug Blagoveshchensk